Baileyville is an unincorporated community in western Nemaha County, Kansas, United States.  As of the 2020 census, the population of the community and nearby areas was 182.  It is located six miles west of Seneca on U.S. Route 36.

History
The community was founded as Haytown, then renamed by Willis J. Bailey and his father to Baileyville.  In 1903, Willis became the 16th Governor of Kansas Willis J. Bailey. The first post office in Baileyville was established in 1880.

As of 1902, Baileyville was reported to be one of two sundown towns in the state, where African Americans were not allowed to reside.

Demographics

For statistical purposes, the United States Census Bureau has defined this community as a census-designated place (CDP).

Education

Primary and secondary
The community is served by Nemaha Central USD 115 public school district.  Nemaha Central High School is located in Seneca with the mascot Thunder.

B&B High school closed in 2014 through school unification. The B&B High School mascot was Falcons.

Colleges and universities
Highland Community College opened in Baileyville in June 2014.

Transportation
The community is served by the Union Pacific Railroad and US highway 36.

References

Further reading

External links
 Nemaha County maps: Current, Historic, KDOT

Census-designated places in Kansas
Census-designated places in Nemaha County, Kansas
Sundown towns in Kansas